Lindernia crustacea is a species of flowering plant known by the common names Malaysian false pimpernel. It is a member of the "new" plant family Linderniaceae. The flower is very small, approximately 1 cm in size. Pollens are round, with 23.5 microns diameter.

References

Linderniaceae
Flora of North America
Taxa named by Carl Linnaeus